Nola squalida is a moth of the family Nolidae first described by Otto Staudinger in 1870. It is found in Turkestan, Himalaya, Sikkim, Bhutan, China, India and Sri Lanka.

References

Moths of Asia
Moths described in 1870
squalida